The 2007–08 Grand Prix of Figure Skating Final was an elite figure skating competition held at the Palavela in Turin, Italy from December 13 through 16, 2007. Medals were awarded in men's singles, ladies' singles, pair skating, and ice dancing.

It was the culminating event of the 2007–08 ISU Grand Prix of Figure Skating series, which consisted of 2007 Skate America, 2007 Skate Canada International, 2007 Cup of China, 2007 Trophée Eric Bompard, 2007 Cup of Russia, and 2007 NHK Trophy competitions. The top six skaters from each discipline competed in the final.

Medals table

Results

Men

Ladies

Pairs
Aliona Savchenko / Robin Szolkowy from Germany set a new world record of 72.14 points under the ISU Judging System for pairs' short program.

Ice dancing

External links

 Official site
 
 

2007 in figure skating
Grand Prix of Figure Skating Final
Grand Prix of Figure Skating Final